József Soproni (26 January 1913 – 21 May 2000) was a Hungarian footballer. He competed in the men's tournament at the 1936 Summer Olympics.

References

External links
 

1913 births
2000 deaths
Hungarian footballers
Olympic footballers of Hungary
Footballers at the 1936 Summer Olympics
Place of birth missing
Association football forwards
Soproni FAC footballers